is the J-pop duo Rythem's tenth single and was released on March 1, 2006 under Sony Music Entertainment Japan label. The title track was used as the ending theme for the Nippon Television's TV show Soukai Jouhou BARAETI SUKKIRI!!. This single was able to land on the #41 spot in the Oricon weekly charts on its first week.

The item's stock number is AICL-1743.

Track listing
Negai
Composition/Lyrics: Rythem
Arrangement: Toshiyuki Mori
Picasso no Kyuujitsu
Composition: Yui Nītsu
Arrangement: CHOKKAKU
Lyrics: Rythem
Negai (instrumental)

2006 singles
Rythem songs
2006 songs